A humpback bridge (or hump bridge) is a name for a type of bridge, specifically an arch bridge, where the span is higher than the ramps on either side, forming a hump-like arrangement. Examples include Chinese and Japanese moon bridges and the Humpback Covered Bridge in the United States.

 Humpback